John Christmas (born August 16, 1982 in Ardmore, Pennsylvania) is an American lacrosse player for the Philadelphia Wings of the National Lacrosse League and for the Boston Cannons of Major League Lacrosse.

Christmas played at the University of Virginia from 2002 to 2005, where he was a two-time USILA All-American and two-time All-ACC selection, and helped lead the Cavaliers to the 2003 NCAA Division I Men's Lacrosse Championship.

Christmas is the head lacrosse coach for the De La Salle high school boys' lacrosse program.

Professional career
Christmas was selected by the Philadelphia Wings in the fifth round (49th overall) of the 2005 Entry Draft. In his first season, he played sparingly, only appearing in two games.  Beginning with the 2007 season, Christmas saw his playing time increase by being on the field during defensive situations in order to take advantage of his speed in the transition game.  In Week 3 of the 2008 NLL season, Christmas was awarded "Transition Player of the Week" honors

Christmas was selected by the Boston Cannons in the first round (5th overall) of the 2005 MLL Collegiate Draft. He won the MLL Most Improved Player honors in his second season in the league, and appeared in the 2006 MLL All-Star Game.

Christmas was named to Team USA in the 2007 World Indoor Lacrosse Championships.

The Wings announced that John Christmas would not play the 2009 season, instead taking the year to focus on establishing a non-profit organization in Philadelphia called L.E.A.P.S. (Lacrosse, Education, Attitude, Perseverance, Success).

Christmas has worked as a volunteer assistant coach at Penn. He also run 141 lacrosse training to handle lacrosse camp counseling.

Statistics

University of Virginia

NLL

MLL

See also
 Virginia Cavaliers men's lacrosse
 Lacrosse in Pennsylvania

References

1982 births
American lacrosse players
Living people
Major League Lacrosse major award winners
Major League Lacrosse players
People from Ardmore, Pennsylvania
Philadelphia Wings players
Sportspeople from Pennsylvania
Virginia Cavaliers men's lacrosse players